Copecion was a genus of early herbivorous mammals that was part of the family Phenacodontidae.

References

External links

Condylarths
Paleocene mammals of North America
Eocene mammals of North America
Eocene genus extinctions
Prehistoric placental genera
Fossil taxa described in 1989